Milwaukee is the largest city in the U.S. state of Wisconsin.

Milwaukee may also refer to:

United States
 Milwaukee County, Wisconsin
 Milwaukee (town), Wisconsin, a former town
 Milwaukee metropolitan area
 Milwaukee, North Carolina, an unincorporated community
 Milwaukee, Pennsylvania, an unincorporated community
 Milwaukie, Oregon, named after the city in Wisconsin
 Pasley, Missouri, an unincorporated community also known as Milwaukee, Missouri
 Old Milwaukee East Colonia and Old Milwaukee West Colonia, two unincorporated communities in Webb County, Texas

Other uses
 Milwaukee brace, a kind of back/body brace used for correcting scoliosis or kyphosis
 Milwaukee Deep, the deepest part of the Atlantic Ocean
 Milwaukee Electric Tool, a manufacturer of heavy-duty portable electric power tools and accessories whose trademark incorporates the word Milwaukee and a lightning bolt
 Milwaukee Junction, neighborhood in Detroit, Michigan
 Milwaukee Lake, a lake in South Dakota
 Milwaukee River, the name of a river in Wisconsin
 Milwaukee Panthers, the athletic program of the University of Wisconsin–Milwaukee
 Old Milwaukee, a brand of American beer first brewed in 1890
 Milwaukee's Best, a brand of American beer first brewed in 1895
 University of Wisconsin–Milwaukee
 Roman Catholic Archdiocese of Milwaukee, Wisconsin
 Episcopal Diocese of Milwaukee, Wisconsin
 Chicago, Milwaukee, St. Paul and Pacific Railroad, called The Milwaukee Road
 USS Milwaukee, the name of four United States Navy ships past and present 
 SS Milwaukee, the name (or derivation) of nine steamships, including a car ferry shipwrecked in a storm while crossing Lake Michigan
 "Milwaukee", the early codename for the design project which was to become the Macintosh II
 Milwaukee (album)